Josipa Lisac (born 14 February 1950) is a Croatian pop rock singer.

Biography
During the 1960s, Lisac was the vocalist of the group Zlatni Akordi. Her first solo album, Dnevnik jedne ljubavi (The Diary of a Love), recorded in 1973, was a huge success and remains today one of the most legendary albums in Croatia. Journalist and producer Peca Popović noted that Dnevnik jedne ljubavi was also only the fourth rock record and the first female-fronted record released in Yugoslavia.

Gubec-beg was the first Croatian rock opera where Josipa had the demanding role of Jana. The opera premiered in 1975, and the aria "Ave Maria" was a standout song that Josipa still performs in concert today. The rock opera was created by Karlo Metikoš, Ivica Krajač and Miljenko Prohaska. The show was performed around Yugoslavia, as well as in Budapest, Trieste, Rome, and Saint Petersburg. It was seen by approximately one million people. The same year, she recorded a jazz album in collaboration with Ernie Wilkins, Clark Terry, Albert Mangelsdorff, and Johnny Basso, produced by Boško Petrović and Karlo Metikoš.

During 1987, Josipa Lisac served as a contestant in the preselection competition, Jugovizija, with hopes to represent Yugoslavia in the Eurovision Song Contest 1987. She sang her hit, "Gdje Dunav ljubi nebo" (Where the Danube Kisses the Sky) and finished in ninth place out of 24. Soon after releasing her album Boginja (Goddess), she became an acclaimed pop artist throughout Yugoslavia.

She had numerous big rock hits, and also sang Bosnian sevdalinka songs ("Omer beže"), as well as Croatian Christmas songs.

Beside being a top act within the world of Croatian popular music, she was also highly acclaimed in the former Yugoslav rock scene. She is known for her strong voice, which she describes as contralto, as well as her unique sense of fashion.

On 5 March 2015, the 40th anniversary of Gubec-beg was celebrated. 

In 2018, Josipa performed in Belgrade, Skopje, Sarajevo, Podgorica, Krk, Zürich, Varaždin, Munich, Gothenburg, Stockholm, and Zadar, among other venues. 

She was in a relationship with the Croatian musician Karlo Metikoš (who also performed under the pseudonym Matt Collins), who she had met in 1971. He died in December 1991. Together they collaborated on 13 LPs.

In February 2020, Lisac performed the Croatian national anthem at the inauguration of President Zoran Milanović. A criminal complaint was submitted against her by attorney Boško Županović for "performing and intoning the Croatian national anthem in a derogatory way" during the inauguration.

Discography 
 Dnevnik jedne ljubavi (1973) (Diary of a Love)
 Najveći uspjesi '68./ '73. (1974) (Greatest hits 68 - 73)
 Gubec-Beg (1975, Rock opera by Karlo Metikoš and Ivica Krajač)
 Josipa Lisac & B.P. Convention Big Band International (1976)
 Made in USA (1979)
 Hir, hir, hir (1980) (Whim, Whim, Whim)
 Lisica (1982) (Vixen)
 Hoću samo tebe (1983) (I Want only You)
 Boginja (1987) (Goddess)
 Balade (1987) (Ballads)
 Live in Lap (1991)
 Čestit Božić (1992) (Merry Christmas)
 Ritam kiše (1993) (Rhythm of the Rain)
 Koncert u čast Karla Metikoša (1995) (Concert in Honour of Karlo Metikoš)
 Antologija (Vols. I to VIII) (1997)
 The Best of (1998)
 Život (2000) (Life)
 Live (2000)
 Live in Concert (2002)
 Koncert ljubavi u čast Karla Metikoša, DVD(2007) (Concert of Love in Honour of Karlo Metikoš)
 Živim po svome (2009) (I Live My Way)

References

External links 
 Official Site
 Josipa Lisac Bio at Croatia Records Official Site 
 Review for Koncert ljubavi u čast Karla Metikoša DVD
 Review for Zivim po svome album

1950 births
20th-century Croatian women singers
Yugoslav women singers
Living people
Musicians from Zagreb
21st-century Croatian women singers